The Men's Belgian Hockey League is a field hockey league organised by the Royal Belgian Hockey Association. The league was established in 1919 as the Division 1. Between the 2006–07 and the 2015–16 seasons it was known as the Honor Division. Since 2016–17 it has been sponsored by Audi and as it also known as the  Audi Hockey League.

Sixteen different clubs have won the league with a 28 times record for Léopold. The current champion is Léopold, having won the 2018–19 by defeating Beerschot in the championship final.

Format
The season usually starts in September and ends around the end of April or the beginning of May. From the 2021–22 season onwards the league is played by twelve teams who play each other twice and who compete for four spots in the championship play-offs. The number one and four and the number two and three play each other in the semi-final and the winners qualify for the final where the winner will be crowned champion. The last two teams are relegated to the National 1 and the tenth placed team plays a relegation play-off against the third-placed team in the second division.

Teams

Number of teams by provinces

Champions

By year

By club

By province

See also
 Women's Belgian Hockey League

References 

 
Field hockey in Belgium
Belgium
Field hockey
1919 establishments in Belgium
Sports leagues established in 1919